Mariannhill is a cluster of suburbs and townships in eThekwini Municipality in KwaZulu Natal, South Africa.

In 1882, Trappist missionary Father Franz Pfanner established Mariannhill Monastery 16 km west of Durban. He promoted local development and opened schools, health clinics, craft workshops, printing presses and farms providing work for hundreds of religious workers and others. The name is derived from those of the Virgin Mary and her mother Saint Anne.

Due to its location close to the industrial townships of Pinetown and Durban, Mariannhill has attracted people from around the province of KwaZulu Natal who are seeking employment. This has led to the development and growth of several townships in Mariannhill: Mpola, Thornwood, Dassenhoek, Tshelimnyama, Mariannridge, KwaMamdekazi, St Wendolins, and others.

In 1909 the St. Francis College was founded in Mariannhill, combining separate schools for boys and girls that had operated since the mid/late 1880s. Its faculty included the Zulu writer and poet Benedict Wallet Vilakazi.

See also
 Mariannhillers, the Congregation of the Missionaries of Mariannhill

References

Suburbs of Durban